Peter of Narbonne may refer to:
  (died after 1090), Bishop of Rodez (before 1053-1079), elected Archbishop of Narbonne (1079-1085)
 Peter of Narbonne (bishop of Albara) (died before 1130), Bishop of Albara (south east of Antioch) from 1098–1100 during the First Crusade;
 Pedro Manrique de Lara (died 1202), sometimes called Peter of Narbonne, Castilian noble, Viscount of Narbonne (1192-1202);
 Peter of Narbonne (bishop of Urgell) (died 1347/8), Bishop of Urgell and Co-Prince of Andorra (1341-1347/8)
  (died 1391), Franciscan missionary, Catholic saint, canonized 1970 with Nicholas Tavelic and two other friars;